Trash Queens is an album by Wrathchild, released in 1985. It is a Compilation of the "Do You Want My Love?" single, the Stackheel Strutt EP, and three live tracks. It has never been officially re-released on CD, though there is a bootleg version with raw vinyl rip circulating.

Track listing 
All songs, written and composed by Wrathchild
Side one
 "Do You Want My Love?" - 3:45
 "Rock the City Down" - 4:35
 "Lipstik Killers" - 3:31
 "Trash Queen" - 4:18

Side two
 "Teenage Revolution" - 3:42
 "Twist of the Knife" (live) - 4:46
 "Cock, Rock, Shock" (live) - 5:46
 "It's Party" (live) - 3:37

Band members
 Rocky Shades - vocals
 Lance Rocket - guitar
 Marc Angel - bass
 Eddie Starr - drums

References

1985 compilation albums
Wrathchild albums